Theretra polistratus is a moth of the  family Sphingidae.

Distribution 
It is known from Papua New Guinea.

Description 
It is an unmistakable species, characterized by three continuous dark green dorsal lines extending from the anterior edge of the mesothorax to the tip of the abdomen. The upperside of the body has a narrow dorsal line and a pair of somewhat broader subdorsal lines running from the mesothorax to the tip of abdomen. The forewing upperside ground colour is silver-grey with a dark green oblique antemedian line and six dark green postmedian lines.

References

Theretra
Moths described in 1904